Deadbolt is the second single off of Skaters debut album Manhattan. It was the first song by the band to chart, reaching 34 on the Alternative Songs chart.

Music video
A music video directed by Charlie Hogg for the song premiered on YouTube a week prior to the track's release.

The music video contains clips rotating between the band performing in a studio and in a warehouse. Interludes of the video are shot of the band walking around New York City, their hometown.

Track listing

Chart positions

References 

2013 singles
2014 singles
2013 songs
Warner Records singles
Skaters (band) songs